The Battle of Leuctra was a battle fought on 6 July 371 BC between the Boeotians led by the Thebans, and the Spartans along with their allies amidst the post-Corinthian War conflict. The battle took place in the vicinity of Leuctra, a village in Boeotia in the territory of Thespiae. The Theban victory shattered Sparta's immense influence over the Greek peninsula, which Sparta had gained with its victory in the Peloponnesian War a generation earlier.

Prelude

In 371 BC, the newly established democracy of Thebes had elected four Boeotarchs, the traditional title of the generals of the Boeotian League, and so proclaimed their intention of reconstituting the aforementioned league that Sparta had disbanded.  During this period, Thebes had an ally in Athens, but Athens was far from happy with the treatment Plataea had received.  When it came to swearing an oath to respect the treaty, Sparta swore on behalf of itself and its allies.  When Epaminondas came forward, asking to swear on behalf of the whole Boeotian League, the Spartans refused, saying he could swear as the representative of Thebes or not at all.  This Epaminondas refused.  (According to Xenophon, the Thebans signed as "the Thebans", and asked the next day to change their signature to "the Boeotians", but one of the Spartan kings, Agesilaus II, would not allow it.) In this, Sparta saw an opportunity to reassert its shaky authority in central Greece.  Hence, the other Spartan king, Cleombrotus I, marched to war from Phocis.

Rather than take the expected easier route into Boeotia through the face defile, the Spartans marched over the hills via Thisbae and took the fortress of Creusis (along with twelve Theban warships) before the Thebans were aware of their presence, and then proceeded to Leuctra where they were confronted by the Boeotian army. Initially, the six Boeotian generals (i.e. the Boeotarchs) present were divided as to whether to offer battle, with Epaminondas being the main advocate in favor of battle.  Only when a seventh arrived, who sided with Epaminondas, was the decision made. In spite of inferior numbers and the doubtful loyalty of their allies, the Boeotians would offer battle on the plain before the town.

The size of the armies
Several ancient writers give figures for one or both of the armies, but, unfortunately, they are contradictory and, in some cases, unbelievable.  Modern scholars' estimates have varied from 6,000 to 9,000 for the Boeotian force. For the Spartan side, most modern scholars favor Plutarch's figure of 10,000 in infantry and 1,000 cavalry.

Battle

The battle opened with the Spartans' mercenary peltasts (slingers, javeliniers, and/or skirmishers) attacking and driving back the Boeotian camp followers and others who were reluctant to fight. According to Xenophon, the Boeotian camp followers were trying to leave the field, as they did not intend to fight; this Spartan action drove them back into the Theban army, inadvertently making the Theban force stronger. There followed a cavalry engagement, in which the Thebans drove their enemies off the field.  Initially, the Spartan infantry were sent into disarray when their retreating cavalry hopelessly disrupted Cleombrotus's attempt to outflank the Theban left column.  At this point the Theban left hit the Spartan right with the Sacred Band of Thebes, led by Pelopidas, at its head. The decisive engagement was then fought out between the Theban and Spartan infantry.

The normal practice of the Spartans (and, indeed, the Greeks in general) was to establish their heavily armed infantry in a solid mass, or phalanx, some eight to twelve men deep.  This was considered to allow for the best balance between depth (the pushing power it provided) and width (i.e., area of coverage of the phalanx's front battle line). The infantry would advance together so that the attack flowed unbroken against their enemy. In order to combat the phalanx's famous right-hand drift, Greek commanders traditionally placed their most experienced, highly regarded and, generally, deadliest troops on the right wing, as this was the place of honor.  By contrast, the shakiest and/or least influential troops were often placed on the left wing. In the Spartan battleplan, therefore, the hippeis (an elite force numbering 300 men) and the king of Sparta would stand on the right wing of the phalanx.

In a major break with tradition, Epaminondas massed his cavalry and a fifty-deep column of Theban infantry on his left wing, and sent forward this body against the Spartan right.  His shallower and weaker center and right wing columns were drawn up so that they were progressively further to the right and rear of the proceeding column, in an Echelon formation. The Theban center and right were held back, screened by skirmishers and cavalry. The infantry engaged, and the Thebans smashed the Spartan right wing. The Spartans' twelve-deep formation on their right wing could not sustain the heavy impact of their opponents' 50-deep column. The Spartan right was hurled back with a loss of about 1,000 men, of whom 400 were some of Sparta's most experienced soldiers, including King Cleombrotus I.

Wilhelm Rüstow and Hermann Köchly, writing in the 19th century, believed that Pelopidas led the Sacred Band out from the column to attack the Spartans in the flank. Hans Delbrück considered this to be a mere misreading of Plutarch. Plutarch does indeed describe Pelopidas leading the Band and catching the Spartans in disorder, but there is nothing in his account that conveys anything other than the Sacred Band being the head of the column, and the Spartans were disordered not because they were taken in the flank but because they were caught in mid-maneuver, extending their line.

Seeing their right wing beaten, the rest of the Peloponnesians, who were essentially unwilling participants, retired and left the enemy in possession of the field.

Aftermath

The arrival of a Thessalian army under Jason of Pherae persuaded a relieving Spartan force under Archidamus not to heap folly on folly and to withdraw instead, while the Thebans were persuaded not to continue the attack on the surviving Spartans.  The Thebans somewhat bent the rules by insisting on conditions under which the Spartans and allies recovered the dead and by erecting a permanent rather than perishable trophy - something that was criticized by later writers.

Historical significance

The battle is of great significance in Greek history.

The use of these tactics by Epaminondas was, perhaps, a direct result of the use of some similar maneuvers by Pagondas, his countryman, during the
Battle of Delium.  Further, Philip II of Macedon, who studied and lived in Thebes, was no doubt heavily influenced by the battle to develop his own, highly effective approach to tactics and armament.  In turn, his son, Alexander, would go on to develop his father's theories to an entirely new level. Many innovations of Philip and Alexander are traced to this battle. Concentration of force, refused flank, and combined arms were tactics that they used in many of their battles. Philip's victories against the Illyrians and at Chaeronea and Alexander's triumphs at the Granicus, Issus, Gaugamela, and the Hydaspes owe credit to the tactical maneuver used to vanquish the Spartans.

Historians Victor Davis Hanson and Donald Kagan have argued that Epaminondas' oblique formation was not an intentional and preconceived innovation in infantry tactics, but was rather a clever response to circumstances.  Because Epaminondas had stacked his left wing to a depth of fifty shields, the rest of his units were naturally left with far fewer troops than normal.  This means that their maintenance of a depth of eight to twelve shields had to come at the expense of either number of companies or their width.  Because Epaminondas was already outnumbered, he had no choice but to form fewer companies and march them diagonally toward the much longer Spartan line in order to engage as much of it as possible.  Hanson and Kagan's argument is therefore that the tactic was more dilatory than anything else.  Whatever its motivation, the fact remains that the tactic did represent an innovation and was undoubtedly highly effective.

The battle's political effects were far-reaching: the losses in material strength and prestige (prestige being an inestimably important factor in the Peloponnesian War) sustained by the Spartans at Leuctra and subsequently at the Battle of Mantinea were key in depriving them forever of their supremacy in Greece. Therefore, the battle permanently altered the Greek balance of power, as Sparta was deprived of its former prominence and was reduced to a second-rate power among the Greek city-states.

Theban supremacy in Greece was short-lived, as it was subsequently lost to the Macedonians, led by Philip II.

In popular culture
The battle is fictionalized, though in some detail, in David Gemmell's book, Lion of Macedon, which includes the significant deviation from historical canon in that it is credited to a young Parmenio(n) instead of Epaminondas, who serves merely to gain permission to carry out the echelon tactic. The battle is also the subject of Victor Davis Hanson's 2011 historical fiction novel, The End of Sparta. The battle was also featured in an episode of the BBC's Time Commanders. It was also featured in the historical fiction graphic novel Serpent and Prey, which takes few creative liberties with the battle's portrayal.

In "The Expanse: Persepolis Rising" by James S.A. Corey, the final major engagement is referred to as the "Battle of Point Leuctra" in a literary homage to the historical battle.

References
Notes

Bibliography
Xenophon, Hellenica, vi. 4. 3–15
Diodorus Siculus, Bibliotheca Historica, xv. 53–56
Plutarch, "Pelopidas," 20–23
Pausanias, Description of Greece, ix. 13. 2-12
Tritle, Lawrence A. The Greek World In The Fourth Century (1987) Routledge. .  Also paperback 1997,

External links

Battle of Leuctra from Encyclopædia Britannica

History of the Leuctra Victory Monument

Leuctra 371 BC
Leuctra 371 BC
371 BC
370s BC conflicts
Theban hegemony